This is a list of Bosnia and Herzegovina football supporters' associations. It includes the supporters of clubs in the Bosnia and Herzegovina league system and those outside Bosnia and Herzegovina who regularly support the national team.

Bosnia and Herzegovina national football team 

BHFanaticos
Ljuti Krajišnici
BHLegion
Belaj Boys

Bosnia and Herzegovina football supporters groups in club competitions 

Alcohol boys - FK Rudar Prijedor 
Manijaci - FK Željezničar Sarajevo
Horde Zla - FK Sarajevo
Škripari - NK Široki Brijeg
Ultras - HŠK Zrinjski Mostar
Lešinari - FK Borac Banja Luka
Red Army - FK Velež Mostar
Robijaši - NK Čelik Zenica
Fukare - FK Sloboda Tuzla
Sokolovi - FK Slavija
Incident - FK Radnik Bijeljina
Red Dragons - NK Zvijezda Gradačac
Gerila - NK Travnik
Sila Nebeska - NK Jedinstvo Bihać
Sioux - FK Radnički Lukavac
Apachi - OFK Gradina
Ljumani - FK Budućnost Banovići
Vandali - NK Iskra Bugojno
Beštije - FK Igman Konjic
Lavovi - NK GOŠK Gabela
Gusari - FK Rudar Kakanj
Demoni - NK Bosna Visoko
Red Warriors - HNK Orašje
No Fear - FK Goražde
Kupus Army - FK Podrinje Janja
Vukovi - FK Drina Zvornik
Vitezovi - NK Vitez
Atomci - NK TOŠK Tešanj
Hahari - NK Krajišnik Velika Kladuša
Šejtani - FK Krajina Cazin
Crvena legija - FK Mladost Doboj Kakanj

Bosnia and Herzegovina supporters in Serbia 

Torcida Sandžak, Ekstremi, Ultra Azzuro - FK Novi Pazar

Katili - FK Sloga Sjenica

Bosnia and Herzegovina supporters in Montenegro 

Gazije Rožaje - FK Ibar

Bosnia and Herzegovina
Supporters
Football supporters